Tony McCombie (born October 11, 1982) is an American realtor, politician, and the Republican Minority Leader of the Illinois House of Representatives. She represents the 89th district. The 89th district consists of all or parts of Carroll, DeKalb, Jo Daviess, Ogle, Stephenson, Winnebago counties in northwestern Illinois. A member of the Illinois House since 2017, she represented the 71st district prior to the 2021 decennial redistricting. 

Prior to her election to Illinois House, McCombie served as Mayor of Savanna, Illinois and as a Savanna Councilwoman.

Illinois House of Representatives

Elections 
McCombie first ran for the 71st District seat in the Illinois House of Representatives in 2016. After an uncontested Republican primary, McCombie faced off against incumbent Democratic nominee Mike Smiddy in the 2016 general election. In the election, McCombie defeated Smiddy with 63% of the vote.

McCombie won re-election to the seat in 2018, 2020, and 2022.

The Illinois House Republican Caucus appointed McCombie to lead its campaign arm for the 2020 general election.

Minority leader 
On November 15, 2022, McCombie was elected to succeed Jim Durkin as Illinois House Minority Leader by a vote of 31-8. Durkin had stepped down after leading the Republican Party through the 2022 Illinois House of Representatives election, which saw the party lose a number of seats in the chamber. McCombie became House Minority Leader on January 11, 2023. She is the first woman to lead the House Republican caucus.

McCombie named Norine Hammond and Ryan Spain as Deputy Minority Leaders.

Committees
As of 2022, McCombie serves on five committees and four subcommittees: 
Restorative Justice committee (Republican Spokesperson)
Public Utilities committee
Judiciary - Criminal committee
Insurance committee
Elementary & Secondary Education: School Curriculum & Policies committee
Juvenile Justice and System Involved Youth subcommittee
Criminal Administration and Enforcement subcommittee
Sex Offenses and Sex Offender Registry subcommittee
Utilities subcommittee.

Legislation
Since first being elected as state representative in 2016, McCombie has been the primary sponsor on several bills that have gone on to become law in Illinois. This includes HB1927, which created the Experimental Aircraft Association Fund as a special fund in the state treasury, and HB1928, which allowed the issuance of Child Abuse Council of the Quad Cities special license plate decals by the Illinois Department of Human Services.

Personal life
McCombie resides in Savanna, Illinois with her husband, Curt. The couple have been married since 2006. Outside of her role in the Illinois House of Representatives, McCombie owns and operates Blue Appraisals and is self-employed as a realtor with Mel Foster Company.

Electoral history

References

External links
 Profile at Illinois General Assembly

1982 births
21st-century American politicians
21st-century American women politicians
Democratic Party members of the Illinois House of Representatives
Living people
People from Savanna, Illinois
Women state legislators in Illinois